Chandrashekhar is an Indian historical drama and biopic television series based on the life on a freedom fighter Chandrashekhar Azad. It premiered on 12 March 2018 on Star Bharat and is produced by Anirudh Pathak.

Cast

Main
Karan Sharma as Chandra Shekhar Azad
Dev Joshi as Teenage Chandra Shekhar Azad
Ayaan Zubair Rahmani as Young Chandra Shekhar Azad
Sneha Wagh as Jagrani Tiwari
Satyajit Sharma as Sitaram Tiwari
Rahul Singh as Ram Prasad Bismil
Arjun Singh Shekhawat as Master Manohar
Jason Shah as John Nott-Bower
Karam Rajpal as Bhagat Singh

Recurring
Chetanya Adib as Ashfaqulla Khan
Vikas Shrivastav as Sachindranath Bakshi
Nikunj Nayana as Shivaram Rajguru
Preetesh Manas as Batukeshwar Dutt
Jaya Binju Tyagi as Durgawati Devi
Ashish Kadian as Sukhdev Thapar
Pankaj Singh as Manmath Nath Gupta
Ghanshyam Garg as Tikaram

Guest
Swati Kapoor as Harleen Kaur
Aanjjan Srivastav as Lala Lajpat Rai
Chirag Vohra as Mahatma Gandhi
Aishwarya Sakhuja as Kamala Nehru
Ram Awana as Veermal
Shaize Khazmi as Bharat

References 

Star Bharat original programming
2018 Indian television series debuts
2018 Indian television series endings
Indian historical television series
Indian independence movement fiction
Cultural depictions of Bhagat Singh
Cultural depictions of Mahatma Gandhi
Indian period television series
Television shows set in the British Raj
Television series set in the 1920s
Television series set in the 1930s
Television shows set in Lahore
Cultural depictions of Subhas Chandra Bose